, also known as Journey to Agartha, is a 2011 Japanese anime film created and directed by Makoto Shinkai, following his previous work 5 Centimeters per Second. This film is described as a "lively" animated film with adventure, action, and romance centered on a cheerful and spirited girl on a journey to say "farewell". The film was released in Japan on May 7, 2011. It was released on DVD and Blu-ray in Japan on November 25, 2011. The film was previously licensed by Sentai Filmworks in North America and released on DVD and Blu-ray in November 2012. On May 9, 2019 it was announced that Sentai had lost the North American license, causing the releases to go out of print. On March 10, 2022, GKIDS announced that they have licensed Children Who Chase Lost Voices, along with three other works by Makoto Shinkai, and will re-release the film on home video in 2023.

Plot
Asuna Watase is a 6th grader who has been forced to grow up quickly ever since her father had died, while her mother, a nurse, works long shifts at a hospital. Asuna spends her solitary days listening to the mysterious music emanating from the cat's-whisker receiver her father gave to her as a memento, accompanied by pet cat Mimi, who bears strange red markings on her fur.

One day, while walking to her clubhouse across a bridge, she is attacked by a fearsome creature and saved by a mysterious teenage boy who calls himself Shun. Asuna treats Shun's wound from fighting the creature and later they both listen to Asuna's radio. Shun tells Asuna he is from another country called Agartha and that he came to this place to find something. He then gives Asuna a blessing in the form of a kiss to the forehead. Asuna leaves hurriedly and tells Shun she'll be back tomorrow. Shun, now alone, looks up at the stars and falls from the ledge to his death.

The next morning, Asuna hears from her mother that a boy was found dead in the river, but refuses to believe it's Shun. In school, Mr. Morisaki, a substitute teacher, is giving a lecture on a book which grabs Asuna's attention when he mentions Agartha, the land of the dead. After school, she visits Morisaki and asks him about Agartha. Morisaki explains that long ago when humankind was young, it needed the guidance of Quetzalcoatls, keepers of the dead, until humans matured and no longer needed them. They went underground along with a few humans who joined them.

Afterwards, Asuna goes to her hideout to find another mysterious boy who looks like Shun standing on the ledge. Just then, a group of armed men called the Arch Angels appear, and attack both of them. The mysterious boy hides in the underground entrance with Asuna, and the two proceed further into the cave when the cave's entrance is bombed. The two meet a Quetzalcoatl who has apparently lost its physical senses and attacks the boy. He refuses to kill the gatekeeper, giving Asuna his clavis, a crystal, and fights back. The Arch Angels interfere, killing the gatekeeper. The Arch Angel commander captures Asuna and uses the clavis to open a gateway to Agartha. The commander and Asuna enter the gateway followed by the boy. Once inside the commander reveals himself to be Morisaki and the boy also reveals himself to be Shin, Shun's younger brother. Morisaki tells Shin that all he wants is to bring back his late wife from the dead. Shin leaves Asuna and Morisaki.

Morisaki tells Asuna that she can go back but she decides to accompany him. They both go into the realm via an underwater entrance. Once inside, they journey to the Gate of Life and Death which can bring the souls of people back from the dead, along with Mimi (who had sneaked in inside Asuna's backpack).

Upon arriving in his village, Shin is told he failed his mission to retrieve the clavis, because Asuna has unknowingly returned with a fragment of one. Shin re-embarks to stop Asuna and Morisaki from wreaking havoc in Agartha.

Along the way, Asuna is kidnapped by a race of monsters called the Izoku. She awakens in a closed area and meets a young girl named Manna; they both try to escape but are not able to. The day begins to darken and the Izoku begin to appear, but they can only move in the shadows. In their escape attempt they encounter Shin, who helps them but is wounded by an Izoku during the escape. Morisaki finds Asuna and Manna down the river as well as Shin with the help of Mimi. Shin tries to retrieve the clavis crystal fragment that belongs to Asuna. However, he is too weak to put up a fight and Morisaki easily defeats him. Asuna convinces Morisaki to take him with them while Manna leads them to her village.

Once there, the villagers are at first reluctant to help the "top-dwellers" but the village elder convinces the guards to let them in. The elder allows them to stay one night at the village because they have brought Manna back but they cannot stay more than that due to past history in that top-dwellers always bring bad luck to Agartha. Meanwhile, Asuna checks up on Shin but he yells at her to leave him alone.

The next morning, Asuna and Morisaki depart from Amaurot by boat, but Mimi no longer wants to accompany them. Shin wakes up later and finds that Mimi has died; Shin, Manna, and the elder proceed to offer Mimi's corpse to the Quetzalcoatl. When Shin sees the villagers riding away to kill them, he decides to follow, in order to protect Asuna. Morisaki and Asuna are walking towards a steep cliff when they are attacked by the villagers but they are saved by Shin. Asuna tries to climb down but is too scared, while Morisaki continues on, after trading his gun for her clavis shard and telling her to go back to the surface.

Meanwhile, Shin is fighting the villagers and is about to be killed when the villagers sense that the clavis crystal has reached the Gate of Life and Death. They leave Shin to let him wander aimlessly, having betrayed his country.

Asuna, following Morisaki's instructions to stay in the water during nighttime because of the Izoku, walks aimlessly and asks herself why she came to Agartha; she finally accepts that she came to Agartha because she was feeling lonely. When the water dries up, she is attacked by the Izoku but is saved by Shin again. The two return to the cliff after seeing the Ark of Life descending. They encounter a Quetzalcoatl who is about to die. Before he dies, the Quetzalcoatl sings its song to send all its memories into the world; Asuna now understands that the last song she heard in her world was Shun's song before he was to die. The Quetzalcoatl offers to take them to the bottom of the cliff.

At the bottom of the cliff, they both find the Gate of Life and Death and enter it. Morisaki has already made a wish for his late wife Lisa to return, however, her soul requires a vessel. Asuna and Shin find Morisaki, who tells Asuna she shouldn't have come; she is soon possessed by the soul of Morisaki’s wife. But this price is insufficient; Morisaki also pays with the loss of an eye. To undo Asuna’s possession, Shin destroys the clavis crystal, despite Morisaki having a knife to his throat. Breaking the clavis brings Asuna's soul back to her body, after she has had a short reunion with Mimi and Shun. Before Lisa leaves Asuna's body, she tells Morisaki to find happiness without her. Asuna is now back to her normal self but Morisaki is devastated and asks Shin to kill him. Shin tells him that carrying the burden of a deceased loved one is humanity's curse, telling Morisaki to live on. Asuna heads back to the surface and is seen making her farewell to Shin and Morisaki, who chose to stay behind. The film ends with an older Asuna looking out her window at the cliff side where she had met Shun and Shin. She then says her goodbyes to her mother as she hurries to her graduation ceremony.

Characters
 - An 11-year-old girl, who has been forced to grow up quickly due to the loss of her father. She spends her time at her clubhouse where she listens to strange music from a crystal radio given to her by her father. .
 - Asuna's substitute teacher who is very knowledgeable about Agartha. He wishes to bring back his wife, from the dead with the power of the Gate of Life and Death. He is a father figure to Asuna. .
 - A mysterious 14-year-old boy from the land of Agartha whom Asuna takes a liking to after he saves her. .
 - Shun's younger brother who was sent by his village to retrieve the clavis crystal from Asuna and Morisaki. 
 - Asuna's classmate and best friend from school. 

Other voice actors include Fumiko Orikasa as Asuna's mother, voiced by Shelley Calene-Black in the English dub, Junko Takeuchi as Asuna's pet cat Mimi (みみ), Rina Hidaka as Manna (まんな), voiced by Emily Neves in the English dub, Tamio Ohki as the Amaurot village elder, voiced by Sam Roman in the English dub, and Sumi Shimamoto as Lisa (リサ), voiced by Shannon Emerick in the English dub.

Development
Shinkai spent 2008 in London, after the completion of 5 Centimeters per Second. He returned to Japan in 2009 to start work on his next project. He released two concept drawings for this film in December 2009 and noted that most of his works in the past decade were stories about characters who have to part ways with those they hold dear, but he wanted to take that theme further and wanted to deal more specifically on how to overcome that loss.

In November 2010 he revealed critical information about Children Who Chase Lost Voices from Deep Below such as the title, plot summary, release date, and a teaser trailer. As with his previous films, Shinkai is the director and screenplay writer. Takayo Nishimura designed the characters and oversaw the animation process. Takumi Tanji directed the art, and musical composer Tenmon collaborated with Shinkai again.

Before the film's release in May 2011, manga adaptations were set to begin serialization in April 2011 in the first issue of the new magazine Monthly Comic Gene and in Monthly Comic Flapper, both by Media Factory.

Broadcast
The film's English adaptation was broadcast on Adult Swim's Toonami programming block in the United States on November 5, 2016.

Critical reception
Luke Halliday from Capsule Computers gave the film a perfect score, heralding the film as Shinkai's finest: "Children Who Chase Lost Voices is an astonishing film that truly feels like the culmination of Shinkai’s entire career up until this point. It is his most ambitious work to date and quite simply his crowning achievement in the art form." He continued on to highlight the film's significance to anime as an artform: "This is perhaps the most important anime film of the new millennium, because it marks an important changing of tides. It is films like Children Who Chase Lost Voices that remind us of how magical anime can truly be."

References

External links
  
 
 
 The Anime Review

2010s Japanese-language films
2011 anime films
Anime with original screenplays
CoMix Wave Films films
Drama anime and manga
Films directed by Makoto Shinkai
Films with screenplays by Makoto Shinkai
Japanese animated films
Romance anime and manga
Sentai Filmworks
Toonami